Megalomys desmarestii, also known as the Martinique muskrat, Desmarest's pilorie, or the Martinique giant rice rat, is an extinct rice rat from Martinique in the Caribbean.

Description
It was among the largest species of West Indian rice rat, as big as a cat, and was one of the first Caribbean mammals to become extinct during the 20th century. It may have been aquatic, as it was known to escape into the sea when pursued by predators, but it never swam away from the island.

Extinction
It was common on Martinique until the end of the 19th century, when attempts were made to exterminate it because it was considered to be a pest in the island's coconut plantations. It was also hunted for food; however, due to a strong musky odor, cooking required people to singe off its hair, air out the body overnight and boil it in two batches of water.  On 8 May 1902, the volcano Mount Pelée erupted, completely destroying the island's principal city of Saint-Pierre. It has been speculated that the rice rat became extinct then or during a later eruption in 1902, but predation by introduced mongooses is more likely to have been the primary cause of its extinction.

References

Literature cited 
Flannery, T. and Schouten, P. 2001. A Gap in Nature: Discovering the World's Extinct Animals. Atlantic Monthly Press, New York. 
Musser, G.G. and Carleton, M.D. 2005. Superfamily Muroidea. Pp. 894–1531 in Wilson, D.E. and Reeder, D.M. (eds.). Mammal Species of the World: a taxonomic and geographic reference. 3rd ed. Baltimore: The Johns Hopkins University Press, 2 vols., 2142 pp. 
Turvey, S. and Helgen, K. 2008. . In: IUCN 2009. IUCN Red List of Threatened Species. Version 2009.2. <www.iucnredlist.org>.  Downloaded on November 15, 2009.
Watts, David. 1990. The West Indies: Patterns of Development, Culture, and Environmental Change Since 1492. Cambridge University Press 

Extinct rodents
Rodent extinctions since 1500
Endemic fauna of Martinique
Megalomys
Mammals described in 1829
Taxa named by Johann Baptist Fischer
Mammals of the Caribbean